Stranger in the Alps is the debut studio album by American musician Phoebe Bridgers, released by Dead Oceans on September 22, 2017.

Background and recording
Stranger in the Alps was produced by Tony Berg and Ethan Gruska. Bridgers recorded the album in between tours over 2016 at Berg's studio in Brentwood, Los Angeles. The album's title is a reference to the edited-for-TV version of the film The Big Lebowski, which changed Walter Sobchak's (John Goodman) line "Do you see what happens when you fuck a stranger in the ass?" to "Do you see what happens when you find a stranger in the Alps?" Bridgers opted to use the phrase because she found it to be "kind of poetic on accident".

Bridgers signed a recording contract with Dead Oceans in June 2017, and the album was scheduled for release on September 22. The album received a limited edition 5th anniversary galaxy colored vinyl pressing on September 22, 2022.

Critical reception

Stranger in the Alps received acclaim from critics; review aggregator Metacritic gave the album a weighted average score of 82/100 based on 16 critic reviews, indicating "universal acclaim".

Josh Modell of The A.V. Club gave the album a perfect score, saying, "Stranger In The Alps alchemizes sorrow into redemptive beauty. It's never about wallowing, but about slowly moving through it. That difference, played out over some incredible, wise-beyond-her-years songwriting, makes it one of the best albums of the year." Writing for Pitchfork, Sam Sodomsky said that the album is "a collection of songs about intimacy, documenting how our relationships affect the way we view ourselves and interact with others... Bridgers' voice has a breezy, conversational flutter [that] sounds best when she double-tracks it in layers of light falsetto", rating the album 7.0/10.

Track listing

Personnel
Credits adapted from liner notes.

Musicians
 Phoebe Bridgers – vocals, guitar, banjo
 Tony Berg – guitar, keyboards
 John Doe – vocals
 Ethan Gruska – keyboards, piano, drums, percussion, drum programming, guitar, bass, baritone guitar, bandura, jet engine, "that incessant toe tapping"
 Greg Leisz – pedal steel guitar
 Rob Moose – strings
 Gabe Noel – cello, bass
 Conor Oberst – vocals
 Daniel Rhine – upright bass
 Gabe Witcher – violin
 Marshall Vore – drums, percussion, vocals
 Harrison Whitford – guitar

Production
 Tony Berg – production, recording
 Ethan Gruska – production
 Mike Mogis – mixing
 Bob Ludwig – mastering
 Rob Moose – string arrangement

Artwork
 Angela Deane – artwork
 Elaine Gandola – photography
 Frank W. Ockenfels III – photography
 Bridgers' mother – photography
 Nathaniel David Utesch – layout

Charts

Certifications

References

2017 debut albums
Phoebe Bridgers albums
Dead Oceans albums
Albums produced by Tony Berg